Ulli Helmbold is a West German para-alpine skier. He represented West Germany at alpine skiing at the 1976 Winter Paralympics and at alpine skiing at the 1980 Winter Paralympics.

He won the gold medal at the Men's Giant Slalom I event at the 1976 Winter Paralympics.

Career 

He competed at three events at the 1976 Winter Paralympics and at two events at the 1980 Winter Paralympics:

 1976 Winter Paralympics
 Men's Alpine Combination I
 Men's Giant Slalom I
 Men's Slalom I
 1980 Winter Paralympics
 Men's Giant Slalom 1A
 Men's Slalom 1A

See also 
 List of Paralympic medalists in alpine skiing

References 

Living people
Year of birth missing (living people)
Place of birth missing (living people)
Paralympic alpine skiers of Germany
Alpine skiers at the 1976 Winter Paralympics
Alpine skiers at the 1980 Winter Paralympics
Medalists at the 1976 Winter Paralympics
Paralympic gold medalists for West Germany
Paralympic medalists in alpine skiing